Staten Island Community Board 2 is a local government unit of the city of New York, encompassing the Staten Island neighborhoods of Arrochar, Bloomfield, Bulls Head, Chelsea, southern Castleton Corners, Dongan Hills, Egbertville, Emerson Hill, southern Graniteville, Grant City, Grasmere, Heartland Village, Midland Beach, New Dorp, New Springville, Oakwood, Ocean Breeze, Old Town, South Beach, Todt Hill, Travis, and southern Willowbrook.

Its current chairman is Robert J. Collegio, and its district manager is Debra Derrico.

References

Community boards of Staten Island